ITVS (Independent Television Service) is a service in the United States which funds and presents documentaries on public television through distribution by PBS and American Public Television, new media projects on the Internet, and the weekly series Independent Lens on PBS. Aside from Independent Lens, ITVS funded and produced films for more than 40 television hours per year on the PBS series POV, Frontline, American Masters and American Experience. Some ITVS programs are produced along with organizations like Latino Public Broadcasting and KQED.

Besides Independent Lens, ITVS series include Indie Lens Storycast on YouTube and Women of the World with Women and Girls Lead Global. Prior series include  Global Voices (on World) and FutureStates.

ITVS is funded by the Corporation for Public Broadcasting (CPB), and is based in San Francisco.

ITVS has funded more than 1,400 films, with an eye on diversity and underrepresented audiences and filmmakers. The organization champions inclusion on the screen and behind the camera: Nearly 70% of ITVS funds go to diverse producers, 50% to women.

History

ITVS was established through legislation by the United States Congress in 1988, “to expand the diversity and innovativeness of programming available to public broadcasting,” and began funding new programming via production licensing agreements in 1990. From 2005-2010, it expanded its reach through the creation of the Global Perspectives Project, which facilitated the international exchange of documentary films made by independent producers.  In 2017, ITVS was named the recipient of a Peabody Institutional Award for its contributions to storytelling in television; the Peabody board of jurors cited "an accomplished range of work as rich as any broadcaster or funder," and in the same year the organization learned it was to receive the 2017 Emmy Governors Award chosen by the Television Academy Board of Governors, awarded during the Creative Arts Emmy Awards ceremony on Saturday, September 9, 2017.

ITVS has discovered and nurtured prominent filmmakers, including one of the first films by Oscar-winning director Barry Jenkins, who made a film. 
In 2015, ITVS created a new digital journalism initiative

Notable works

Among the prominent films funded by ITVS:

I Am Not Your Negro (Oscar-nominated film by Raoul Peck)  
Meet the Patels (Ravi and Geeta Patel)
TOWER (Keith Maitland) 
Newtown (Kim A. Snyder) 
The Force (Pete Nicks)  
Dolores (Peter Bratt)  
Best of Enemies (By Oscar-winner Morgan Neville, Robert Gordon)
Have You Heard From Johannesburg (Primetime Emmy Award winner by Connie Field)
A Lion in the House (Primetime Emmy Award winner by Julia Reichert, Steven Bognar)
Brother to Brother (ITVS-funded drama by Rodney Evans, starring then-unknown Anthony Mackie)

Independent Lens 
Since 1999, ITVS has produced Independent Lens, a weekly television series airing on PBS presenting documentary films made by independent filmmakers. For the first three seasons Independent Lens aired 10 episodes each fall season. In 2002, PBS announced that in 2003 the series would relaunch and expand to 29 primetime episodes a year.

In 2017, ITVS announced Indie Lens Storycast, a free subscription-based docuseries channel on YouTube, co-produced with PBS Digital Studios. Storycast launched in September of that year with docuseries Iron Maidens and The F Word.

In addition, ITVS produces Indie Lens Pop-Up, formerly Community Cinema, an in-person series that brings people together for film screenings and community-driven conversations, featuring documentaries seen on Independent Lens.

Awards
32 ITVS films have won Peabody Awards, including How to Survive a Plague by David France; Marco Williams and Whitney Dow’s Two Towns of Jasper; Leslee Udwin’s India’s Daughter; and The Invisible War by Kirby Dick and Amy Ziering.

ITVS-Supported Peabody Winners

Between the Folds
Bhutto 
Billy Strayhorn: Lush Life
Brakeless
Chisholm '72: Unbought & Unbossed
’’Coming Out Under Fire’’
Craft in America
Deej
Dolores
Don't Tell Anyone (No Le Digas a Nadie)
Flag Wars
The Gate of Heavenly Peace
A Healthy Baby Girl
The House I Live In 
How to Survive a Plague
India's Daughter
The Invisible War
The Judge
King Corn
Latino Americans
The Lord Is Not on Trial Here Today
Lorraine Hansberry: Sighted Eyes/Feeling Heart
Mapping Stem Cell Research: Terra Incognita
Maya Angelou: And Still I Rise 
Minding the Gap
The Most Dangerous Man in America: Daniel Ellsberg and the Pentagon Papers
My Perestroika
Newtown
The Order of Myths
Park Avenue: Money, Power & the American Dream’’Solar MamasReel Injun A Room NearbySisters in LawStill Life with Animated DogsSummer PastureTravisTwo Towns of JasperWho Killed Chea Vichea?TrappedITVS-Supported News & Documentary Emmy WinnersAbacus: Small Enough to JailForever PureTOWERThe Armor of Light Thank You for Playing  In Football We Trust (T)error Best of EnemiesPromises  School Prayer: A Community at WarBilly Strayhorn: Lush LifeBe Good, Smile Pretty The Invisible WarLast Train HomeOperation Homecoming: Writing the Wartime ExperienceThe WoodmansArt & Copy The HomestretchMedoraMade in L.A.Where Soldiers Come FromBlinkA Lion's TrailDetropiaThe Trials of Muhammad AliGirls Like Us Operation Homecoming: Writing the Wartime ExperienceWhen I Walk The InterruptersNobody's BusinessOutlawed in PakistanThe English SurgeonFenceline: A Company Town DividedITVS-Supported Primetime Emmy Winners Have You Heard From Johannesburg A Lion In The House''

References

External links
 Official ITVS site
 Independent Television Service (ITVS) on IMDb
 
 Independent Lens | PBS
 Independent Lens on IMDb
 
 FutureStates
 FUTURESTATES on IMDb
 

Public television in the United States
Peabody Award winners